Dongjin may refer to the following locations in China:

 Dongjin, Guangxi, town in Gangnan District, Guigang
 Dongjin, Heilongjiang, town in Beilin District, Suihua
 Dongjin, Hubei, town in Xiangzhou District, Xiangyang, Hubei
 Dongjin Bridge, Ganzhou, Jiangxi

See also
 Eastern Jin dynasty, or Dong Jin
 Dongjing (disambiguation)
 Dong Jin, 8th century general of the Chinese Tang Dynasty